was a Japanese daimyō of the Edo period, who ruled the Mito Domain. His childhood name was Tsuruchiyo (鶴千代).

Family
 Father: Tokugawa Harumori (1751-1805)
 Mother: Yayohime, daughter of Ichijo Michika
 Wife: Manhime, daughter of Tokugawa Shigenori of Kishu Domain
 Concubines:
 Jose'in
 Shimada-dono
 Toyama-dono
 Children:
 Kashiwahime by Manhime
 Yasuhime by Manhime
 Tokugawa Narinobu (1797-1829) by Jose'in
 Juko (1796-1844) married Nijo Narinobu by Shimada
 Tadahime married Matsudaira Yoshitatsu of Takasu Domain by Shimada
 Kiyoko married Takatsukasa Masamichi by Toyama
 Tokugawa Nariaki by Toyama

References

1773 births
1816 deaths
Lords of Mito